Iiro Aalto (born 19 July 1977) is a Finnish former football player. He started his career with Finnish football club Pallo-Iirot, then moved to FC Haka and spent most of his career at Helsingin Jalkapalloklubi but from December 2007 played for Cypriot club Olympiakos Nicosia. He started his career in Pallo-Iirot.

Aalto returned to Finland in May 2008 to play for Tampere United. After his loan spell at Tampere he moved to TPS Turku.

References

External links 
 Guardian Football
  Finland Report

1977 births
Living people
Finnish footballers
Finnish expatriate footballers
FC Haka players
Helsingin Jalkapalloklubi players
Olympiakos Nicosia players
Expatriate footballers in Cyprus
Finnish expatriate sportspeople in Cyprus
Veikkausliiga players
Cypriot First Division players
Association football defenders